Ruth Radelet (born April 28, 1982) is an American singer, songwriter and musician. She is best known for her work as the lead vocalist in the electronic band Chromatics, formed in 2001. A native of Portland, Oregon, Radelet joined Chromatics in 2006 after the band relocated to Portland from Seattle, Washington. The band's first album to feature Radelet as vocalist and guitarist was their cult release Night Drive (2007), the record which marked a notable shift in their sound, incorporating elements of synth pop and post punk.

Radelet also appeared with Chromatics in the Showtime series revival of Twin Peaks (2017).

Early life
Ruth Radelet was born and raised in Portland, Oregon along with her two sisters, Sarah and Sofya.

Career
Radelet joined Chromatics in 2006 with Adam Miller, Nat Walker, and Johnny Jewel, releasing Night Drive in 2007. Radelet provided contributions to Symmetry's debut album, Themes For An Imaginary Film (2011). Chromatics' follow-up album to Night Drive was Kill for Love, released the following year. The band was invited to perform at the Chanel show by Karl Lagerfeld in 2012.

Radelet appeared with Chromatics in the Showtime 2017 revival of Twin Peaks.

After the disbandment of Chromatics in 2021 Radelet has been working on a solo record and recently released the single "Crimes" produced by Filip Nikolic formerly of Poolside. 
“She’s definitely establishing her own artistic identity with this solo output… it’s beyond welcome to hear Radelet soaring on ‘Crimes’” - Uproxx

“Radelet's vocals are mercurial and slightly spooky while kaleidoscopic synths sparkle around her.” - FLOOD

Influences
Radelet has cited folk and country artists such as Bob Dylan, Kris Kristofferson, and Tom Waits as influences, as well as new wave bands such as New Order. She has also cited films as an influence on her music, including work by directors Francis Ford Coppola, Martin Scorsese, and Brian De Palma.

Personal life
Radelet was romantically involved with bandmate Johnny Jewel for several years; commenting in an interview with The Huffington Post, she said: "I consider us to be old friends, and we have continued to build on that foundation even though the dynamic is always evolving." She relocated to New York in 2011 and Los Angeles in 2015.

Works

Discography

Singles
 
 "Twilight" (2021) an Elliott Smith cover featured on 30th Anniversary of Kill Rock Stars 
 "Crimes" (2022) self-released

Filmography

See also
In 2020 Ruth Radelet sang on "Blinding Lights - Chromatics Remix" by The Weeknd, Chromatics (band) and Johnny Jewel
Additionally in 2022 at Coachella Valley Music and Arts Festival it was revealed that The Weeknd used a sample of Radelet's voice while playing live.

Notes

References

External links

Ruth Radelet at Billboard
Ruth Radelet images at BFA

1982 births
Living people
American people of Belgian descent
American electronic musicians
Musicians from Portland, Oregon
Singers from Oregon
Songwriters from Oregon
Guitarists from Oregon
21st-century American singers
21st-century American women singers
21st-century American guitarists
American women in electronic music
21st-century American women guitarists
People from Seaside, Oregon